The 2021 Census of the Czech Republic took place between 27 March and 9 April 2021. It was conducted by the Czech Statistical Office. Failure to complete the census could lead to a fine of 10,000 Czech koruna.

References

External links
 

Censuses in the Czech Republic
Census
Czech Republic